The Jurong Community Hospital (JCH) is a 400-bed community hospital in Jurong East, Singapore. It is part of an integrated healthcare development that includes the Ng Teng Fong General Hospital (NTFGH). While Jurong Community Hospital has commenced operations from 22 July 2015, it was officially opened alongside NTFGH on 10 October of the same year.

History

Construction 
The building of the integrated healthcare hub incorporating both the Ng Teng Fong General Hospital and Jurong Community Hospital began in September 2012 and was slated for completion by 2015 (originally December 2014 for NTFGH), with an estimated budget of S$700 million. Having won the tender for its construction, CPG Consultants served as the main developer of the integrated hub.

In 2013, the integrated hub (including Jurong Community Hospital) received the Green Mark Platinum Award by the Building Construction Authority of Singapore for its inclusion of environmentally sustainable design features.

Opening 
The hospital commenced operations on 22 July 2015.

On 10 October that year, Jurong Community Hospital, along with Ng Teng Fong General Hospital, was officially opened at JurongHealth's Health Carnival, by guest-of-honour Prime Minister Lee Hsien Loong.

Features

Mobility Park and LIFE Hub 
JCH is the first hospital in Singapore to have a mobility park, which enables patients to gradually re-adapt to daily living. It is equipped with ramps, steps, textured surfaces, as well as a simulation of public transport facilities (including MRT carriages and buses), in a safe environment.

In addition, the LIFE Hub, comprising a mock-up of a three-room HDB flat fitted with accessibility products, aids patients in acclimatising back into their home environment.

Connectivity 
JCH (as well as the Ng Teng Fong General Hospital) are linked to J-Walk, a second-story pedestrian network in the Jurong Gateway area that connects them to Jurong East MRT station and Jurong East Bus Interchange, as well as the nearby shopping malls (Jem, Westgate, Big Box, IMM).

See also 
 Ng Teng Fong General Hospital
 Healthcare in Singapore
 Hospitals in Singapore
 Ministry of Health (MOH), Singapore

References

External links 
 Jurong Community Hospital

Hospitals in Singapore
Jurong
2015 establishments in Singapore